Karl Champley is an Australian master builder, television personality and actor. He is currently appearing on Ellen's Design Challenge. He has hosted Wasted Spaces on the American television network DIY Network. He has also presented DIY to the Rescue (2003) and DIY Inside: The Home Builder's Show (2005) on the same channel.

A qualified tradesman, contractor and builder, Champley has been involved in the building trade since the 1980s. In his native Australia, he is a member of the Master Builders' Association of New South Wales. He is also a registered and certified Home Inspector in the United States, where he currently resides with his wife, Diane Matthews. The couple have lived in Los Angeles since 2001.

References
http://www.diynetwork.com/search/karl-champley-

External links
Champley's official website
 
Champley's videos on HGTV.com

http://www.diynetwork.com/search/karl-champley- DIY Network

Living people
Australian television presenters
Australian woodworkers
Male actors from Sydney
Year of birth missing (living people)